Marcus Graf (born 1974 in Hamm), is an art curator, writer and artist based in Istanbul, Turkey.

Bibliography
 Graf, Marcus. Conceptual Colors of Genco Gulan, Revolver Publishing, 2012. 
 Graf, Marcus. Genco Gulan: Kavramsal Renkler, Galata Perform Publishing, 2008. 
 Graf, Marcus, Istanbul Biennale – Geschichte, Position, Wirkung, KV-Kadmos, Berlin, 2011.
 Graf, Marcus, Löchte Jan, Zier Tobias, Jan Löchte – Der neue Katalog ist da, Staatliche Akademie der Bildenden Künste Stuttgart, 2010.
 Graf, Marcus, Fragmented Realities, Boyut, Istanbul, 2009.
 Graf, Marcus & Baur, Andreas & Hodjak, Franz,  Rudolf Reiber. Blast of Silence, Staatliche Akademie der Bildenden Künste Stuttgart, 2007.

External links
Mekan 34 official website
iS.CaM official website

1974 births
Living people
Curators from Istanbul
Turkish art curators
German curators